Chris Rumble (born April 16, 1990) is an American professional ice hockey defenceman currently an unrestricted free agent who most recently played with the Iserlohn Roosters of the Deutsche Eishockey Liga (DEL).

Playing career
Prior to turning professional, Rumble attended Canisius College where he played three seasons with the Canisius Golden Griffins men's ice hockey team which competes in the NCAA Division I Atlantic Hockey conference. In his freshman season he helped the Golden Griffins capture the 2012-13 Atlantic Hockey championship, and in his junior year his outstanding play was rewarded when he was named to the Atlantic Hockey All-Conference First Team.

On September 20, 2017, Rumble signed his first European contract in agreeing to a one-year deal with German outfit, the Fischtown Pinguins of the DEL.

Rumble played through two season with the Pinguins, before leaving as free agent to sign a one-year deal with fellow DEL competitors, Iserlohn Roosters, on May 10, 2019.

Awards and honors

References

External links 

1990 births
American men's ice hockey defensemen
Binghamton Senators players
Canisius Golden Griffins men's ice hockey players
Evansville IceMen players
Fischtown Pinguins players
Iserlohn Roosters players
Living people
Wichita Thunder players